Hibbard is an unincorporated community in Union Township, Marshall County, Indiana.

History
Hibbard was originally called Dante, in honor of the Italian poet Dante Alighieri, and under that name was platted in 1883. A post office called Hibbard was established in 1887, and remained in operation until it was discontinued in 1958.

Hibbard was a station on the New York, Chicago and St. Louis Railroad.

Geography

References

Unincorporated communities in Marshall County, Indiana
Unincorporated communities in Indiana